Maurice Fabián 'Mauri' Closs (born 10 June 1971) is an Argentine politician, formerly of the Radical Civic Union (UCR) but now leading the Front for the Renewal of Concord, allied to the Front for Victory in support of President Cristina Fernández de Kirchner. He is a National Senator representing Misiones Province, which he led as governor from 2007 to 2015.

Born in Aristóbulo del Valle, Misiones, Closs graduated as a lawyer from the National University of the Northeast, and studied at postgraduate level at the National University of Misiones. He worked in the family business and studied further at California State University, Los Angeles in Los Angeles and at the United Nations Economic Commission for Latin America and the Caribbean in Chile.

Between 1996 and 2000, Closs headed the Radical Youth movement and in 2002 he was elected president of the Misiones national committee of the UCR. In 2003, Closs and most of his fellow Misiones Radicals joined the Front for the Renewal of Concord in support of the re-election of incumbent Justicialist Party governor Carlos Rovira. 

Following the election, Rovira appointed Closs as chief of cabinet, and in 2005 he was elected to the Senate for the Front, becoming the youngest senator in the country at age 35. He sat in support of then President Néstor Kirchner.

Closs was elected governor in 2007.

References

External links 
  Misiones Province
  Official website

1971 births
Argentine people of German descent
Argentine people of Swedish descent
California State University, Los Angeles alumni
Governors of Misiones Province
Living people
Members of the Argentine Chamber of Deputies elected in Misiones
Members of the Argentine Senate for Misiones
National University of Misiones alumni
National University of the Northeast alumni
People from Misiones Province
Radical Civic Union politicians